Grapevine fanleaf virus (GFLV) is a plant pathogenic virus of the family Secoviridae. It infects grapevines, causing chlorosis of the leaves and lowering the fruit quality. Because of its effect on grape yield, GFLV is a pathogen of commercial importance. It is transmitted via a nematode vector, Xiphinema index. This nematode acquires the virus through feeding on roots of an infected plant, and passes it on in the same manner.

Host and Symptoms: The host for Grapevine fanleaf virus or GFLV is the vitis species. This includes V. vinifera, V. rupestris, and hybrids. The symptoms of GFLV are “distortion of leaves and may cause unusual chlorotic (yellow) patterns on leaves, such as a yellow mosaic or yellow veins.”(5) Plants infected with GFLV also will have a reduced size and the fruit will be softer when compared to fruit from healthy plants. The leaves will be “severely distorted, asymmetrical, cupped and puckered, and exhibit acute dentations”, these symptoms tend to look like a fan, hence the name fanleaf virus. The canes may also show signs of abnormal branching, double nodding, and short internodes. Affected vines can also show signs of yellow mosaic which may affect all parts of the vine. The berries of the plant have a reduced yield and are smaller. They also have irregular ripening times.(4) 

Disease Cycle: The disease is spread by Xiphinema index a dagger nematode. The typical life cycle of  Xiphinema index nematode goes through 6 life cycle stages. The females lay the eggs into the soil. Once the juveniles hatch from the egg they go through 4 molting stages where they get bigger after each molt. The nematode feeds and attacks the plant at all stages except when it's an egg. It uses its stylist to feed on the plant. During the feeding the nematode secretes enzymes into the plant to digest plant cells. During the feeding process the nematode can transfer the disease into the plant and it is also at this point that the nematode can become a carrier of the pathogen if it is not one already.(6)  

Management: To prevent GFLV planting certified disease free plants will make it so that the nematodes can not spread the disease unless they already have the pathogen. Another prevention method is the disinfect the pruning tools between each plant to help reduce the amount of disease spread from humans. An additional way to manage the disease is to get rid of any diseased plants and before the season starts test the soil for GLFV.(7) Finally, you can cover the crops with nematicidal properties and deep plow the fields and use nematode resistant rootstocks.(5)

External links 
 ICTVdB—The Universal Virus Database: Grapevine fanleaf virus
 Family Groups—The Baltimore Method
 Taxonomy Browser at PDBe

References 

Nepoviruses
Viral grape diseases